Tucci is a surname of Italian origin, and may refer to:

 Carmine Tucci (born 1933), Italian ice hockey player
 Christine Tucci (born 1967), American actress
 Davide Tucci (born 1987), Italian-Maltese actor and model
 Debara L. Tucci, American otolaryngologist
 Dudu Tucci (born 1955), Brazilian musician
 Gabriella Tucci (1929–2020), Italian soprano
 Giovanni Maria Tucci (16th century), Italian painter
 Giuseppe Tucci (1894–1984), Italian scholar, explorer, expert on Tibetan culture
 Joseph M. Tucci, known as Joe Tucci (born 1947), former chairman of the board of directors of EMC Corporation
 Lin Tucci (born 1960), American actress
 Maria Tucci (born 1941), Italian-American actress
 Michael Tucci (born 1946), American actor
 Niccolò Tucci (1908–1999), Swiss-Italian writer
 Nicholas Tucci (1981–2020), American actor
 Roberto Tucci (1921–2015), Italian Roman Catholic Cardinal and theologian
 Stanley Tucci (born 1960), American actor, writer, producer and director
 Terig Tucci (1897–1973), Argentine composer, violinist, pianist, and mandolinist
 William Tucci, American comicbook creator

Furthermore, Tucci is the name of a former Catholic bishopric and present Latin Catholic titular see in Andalusia (southern Spain).